Craig Teitzel (born 26 December 1963) is an Australian former professional rugby league footballer who played in the 1980s and 1990s.

Playing career
Originally from Tully, Queensland, Teitzel made his first grade debut for the Western Suburbs Magpies in Round 1 of the 1988 NSWRL season. After two seasons with the club, Teitzel moved to the Illawarra Steelers, where he played 50 games over four seasons. 

At the end of the 1993 season, Teitzel joined the Warrington Wolves for the 1993-94 RFL Championship season. After one season with the club, Teitzel returned to Australia in 1994 and was set to retire before joining the North Queensland Cowboys for the 1995 ARL season. He played 12 games for the club in their inaugural season before retiring.

Statistics

NSWRL/ARL

Championship

References

External links
(archived by web.archive.org) Statistics at wolvesplayers.thisiswarrington.co.uk

1963 births
Living people
Australian rugby league players
Australian expatriate sportspeople in England
Western Suburbs Magpies players
Illawarra Steelers players
Warrington Wolves players
Rugby league props
Rugby league second-rows
North Queensland Cowboys players
Rugby league players from Queensland